The Circuit of the Border Region was a men's cycling race organized for the last time in 1983. The start and finish place was Ledegem (West Flanders, Belgium)

The competition's roll of honor includes the successes of Rik Van Looy, Patrick Sercu and Roger De Vlaeminck.

Winners

References 

Cycle races in Belgium
1969 establishments in Belgium
Defunct cycling races in Belgium
Recurring sporting events established in 1969
Recurring sporting events disestablished in 1983
1983 disestablishments